Lisa Rani Ray (born 4 April 1972) is a Canadian actress. She began her modelling career in India in the early 1990s, appearing for leading Indian brands like Bombay Dyeing and Lakmé. She made her acting debut in 1996 in the Tamil film Nethaji. Her first Bollywood appearance was in 2001, in the offbeat romantic thriller Kasoor. Through her acting career, Ray has demonstrated a penchant for issue-oriented portrayals, most notably in the 2005 Oscar nominated Canadian film Water and the award-winning South African feature The World Unseen, described by a reviewer as "one of the best-conceived queer films of the past year."

In 2009, Ray was diagnosed with multiple myeloma, an incurable form of blood cancer. She began writing The Yellow Diaries, a blog about her experiences of having cancer. Her writing and columns have since regularly appeared in multiple major publications. Ray remains an active advocate of stem-cell therapy and has participated in several successful fundraisers and cancer awareness campaigns.

In 2011, Ray began hosting a popular travel show on Discovery Channel India alongside appearing as host and judge in Food Network's highest rated show, Top Chef Canada.

In 2016, Ray opened an Instagram account dedicated to poetry. In March 2019, Ray participated as a panelist on the 2019 edition of Canada Reads where she advocated for David Chariandy's award-winning second novel, Brother.

Early life
Ray was born in Toronto to a Bengali Hindu father and a Polish Catholic mother and grew up in the suburb of Etobicoke. She spoke Polish with her maternal grandmother and watched movies of Federico Fellini and Satyajit Ray with her cinephile dad. During her childhood she spent some time in Calcutta.

She excelled academically, doing five years of high school in four, while attending three different high schools: Etobicoke Collegiate Institute, Richview Collegiate Institute and Silverthorn Collegiate Institute.

Modelling, film and television career

1991–2000
Ray's modelling career began when she was "discovered" during a family vacation in India while still in her teens. An advertisement for Bombay Dyeing where she appeared in a black swimsuit opposite Karan Kapoor earned Ray her first taste of public attention. A subsequent meeting with Maureen Wadia, editor of Indian fashion magazine Gladrags, resulted in an iconic swimsuit cover that catapulted Ray to nationwide fame in India. "Most of my most fulfilling professional moments came to me via serendipity", Ray later wrote.

By the time the Gladrags cover broke, Ray was already back in Toronto ready to begin university. Her plans were thwarted after a tragic auto accident that would consign her mother to a wheelchair for the rest of her life. Ray returned to India and went on to become one of the country's first supermodels, and the face of Lakmé and Bombay Dyeing. Ray would later acknowledge this coinciding of professional triumph and personal tragedy as a recurring theme in her life. "I have come to recognise that every major turning point in my life is preceded by pain", she wrote in Femina in 2016.

As one of India's most successful cover models, Ray would subsequently lend her face to iconic global brands such as L’Oréal, MasterCard, De Beers and Rado. A Times of India poll named her the "ninth most beautiful woman of the millennium," the only model in the top ten. She co-anchored the TV show Star Biz on Star Movies and appeared in a music video for Afreen Afreen, an iconic ghazal written by renowned lyricist Javed Akhtar, and composed and performed by Nusrat Fateh Ali Khan.

2001–2009

After turning down a number of roles, Ray made her Indian Film Industry debut in 2001 with the Hindi film Kasoor, opposite Aftab Shivdasani, in which her voice was dubbed by Divya Dutta, because she could not speak Hindi. In spite of that, her performance received positive reviews. Her work in the film also caught the eye of Deepa Mehta, who cast her in the romantic Indian-Canadian romp Bollywood/Hollywood in 2002.

Realizing that acting was something that she wanted to pursue more seriously, Ray moved to London to concentrate on a career in the performing arts. While there, Ray studied at the Central School of Speech and Drama, the London Centre for Theatre Studies, the Desmond Jones school of Physical Theatre, and BADA. She graduated from the Academy of Live and Recorded Arts (ALRA), in 2004, with a post-graduate degree in acting. While studying, Ray made a conscious effort to not accept any film offers until she had graduated. However, while still at ALRA, she received another call from Deepa Mehta, who made her an offer she simply could not refuse—the lead role of Kalyani in Mehta's much-anticipated, and eventually highly controversial, feature, Water. In the film, Lisa spoke her lines in Hindi, although her voice was dubbed in the final cut. Water released in 2005 to both national and global critical acclaim, with the venerable Roger Ebert describing it as "lovely in the way Satyajit Ray's films are lovely",

Ray has since worked in productions from Canada, Europe, and the United States. Past roles include a farm girl in All Hat, a school teacher in A Stone's Throw, and a housewife in 1950s-apartheid South Africa in The World Unseen. In 2008 Ray starred, alongside Sheetal Sheth and Amber Rose Revah, in the Shamim Sarif directed British romantic comedy I Can't Think Straight that went on to win awards in queer film festivals worldwide, including Dallas OUT TAKES, Miami Gay and Lesbian Film Festival, and Tampa International Gay and Lesbian Film festival. 

After graduation, Ray based herself out of Milan, Paris, and New York from 2004 to 2008, returning to Toronto upon her mother's death in late 2008. In 2007, Ray completed filming for Kill Kill Faster Faster, which is a contemporary film noir inspired by the critically acclaimed novel of the same name, by Joel Rose. She guest-starred in a 2009 episode of the USA Network series Psych, and appeared in Woody Harrelson starrer Canadian-American superhero film Defendor. Also in 2009, she starred in the Deepa and Dilip Mehta comedy Cooking with Stella.

Appearing at the 2009 Toronto International Film Festival in support of the film, Ray revealed that she had been diagnosed with multiple myeloma.

2010s
On Christmas in 2009, Ray received a stem cell transplant to treat her rare cancer. In April 2010, she announced she was cancer-free due to the transplant. She gave a candid interview on her personal cancer trauma and surviving it, appearing on the cover of the 2010 anniversary issue of the Indian men's luxury magazine The Man.

2010 saw Ray in UniGlobe Entertainment's cancer docu-drama titled 1 a Minute. The documentary was made by Namrata Singh Gujral and featured cancer survivors Olivia Newton-John, Diahann Carroll, Melissa Etheridge, Mumtaz, Bárbara Mori and Jaclyn Smith, as well as William Baldwin, Daniel Baldwin, and Priya Dutt, whose lives have been touched by cancer. The feature was narrated by Kelly McGillis.

On 5 July 2010, Ray hosted an informal lunch for Queen Elizabeth II and Prince Philip during their visit to Toronto.

In 2011, Ray acted in the stage play Taj, opposite Kabir Bedi at Luminato Festival, Toronto's International Festival of Arts and Ideas. Written by Canadian playwright John Murrell, Taj combined poetry, music, theatre, and the Indian classical dance form kathak. The production was described by The Globe and Mail critic Deirdre Kelly "as luminous and poignant as the building that inspired it".

In the same year, Ray appeared in Craig Goodwill's award-winning fantasy drama film Patch Town, and a season 4 episode of Canadian Television period crime drama series Murdoch Mysteries, titled "The Black Hand". 

She presented the 2011 IIFA Awards in Toronto, and was a co-presenter the 2011 Giller Prize along with singer-songwriter Nelly Furtado and roots rock guitarist Robbie Robertson.

Also in 2011, Ray appeared as host and travel guide on Oh My Gold, a five part series on Discovery Travel & Living, now TLC India.

In 2012, Ray began hosting season two of Top Chef Canada, Food Network Canada's highest rated series. The season premiered in March 2012.

Speaking to The Telegraph in 2012, Ray remarked, "I think every film that I’ve done so far has been a turning point because I experimented with each one and grew professionally. The movies I chose, dealt with a lot of thought-provoking subjects.

In 2016, Ray starred in Ram Gopal Varma's Veerappan. She also played a crucial supporting role in 2017’s Dobaara, the official Bollywood adaptation of supernatural horror film Oculus.

Since 2019, Ray has appeared as part of an ensemble cast in the Amazon Prime Video web series Four More Shots Please!. After a successful first season aired in over 200 countries and regions, the series returned for a second season in 2020 and a third season in 2022.

Personal life 
On 23 June 2009, Ray was diagnosed with multiple myeloma, a cancer of the white blood cells known as plasma cells, which produce antibodies. It is a rare disease. In April 2010, she announced that she was cancer-free, after an autologous stem cell transplant using her own stem cells. As multiple myeloma is an incurable disease, Ray is not completely cured of the disease.

In February 2012, Ray announced her engagement to management consultant Jason Dehni. On 20 October 2012, Ray and Dehni (then a banking executive) were married in California's Napa Valley.

In September 2018, Ray announced that she and her husband became parents to twin daughters via surrogacy, in June 2018.

Filmography

Film

Television

Philanthropy
 2009: 5K Your Way Walk/Run, MMWalk for the Cure
 2009: Plan Canada's 'Because I Am A Girl' campaign
 2010: Plan Canada's 'Because I Am A Girl' campaign
 2010: "1 a Minute", to inspire women and give them hope
 2010: Estee Lauder Breast Cancer Awareness
 2011: 'Make Myeloma Matter' media campaign
 2011: Artbound, in support of Free The Children
 2011: GIRL 20 SUMMIT
 2012: BE FAIR 2 RARE
 2012: Wellspring Cancer 'Graduate' Fashion show
 2012: "Rhythm and Soul"-THE SPARK GALA 2012, to Ignite A Child's Potential
 2012: Run or Walk, MM5K
 2012: Plan Canada's 'Because I Am A Girl' campaign
 2012: Ambassador for Pantene Beautiful Lengths campaign in Canada

Brand ambassador
 Brand ambassador of Rado (watches) in India
 Lisa named Ambassador for 'Pantene Beautiful Lengths' Campaign

See also
 List of Canadian actors
 List of Indian film actresses

References

External links

 
 
 

1972 births
Living people
Actresses from Toronto
People with multiple myeloma
Bengali Hindus
Canadian Hindus
Canadian film actresses
Canadian actresses of Indian descent
Canadian people of Polish descent
Canadian people of Bengali descent
Canadian infotainers
Canadian television hosts
Canadian expatriate actresses in India
Actresses in Hindi cinema
Actresses in Tamil cinema
Actresses in Telugu cinema
Actresses of European descent in Indian films
Alumni of the Academy of Live and Recorded Arts
Canadian women television hosts
20th-century Canadian actresses
21st-century Canadian actresses